Madvillainy 2: The Madlib Remix is a remix album by American hip hop duo Madvillain, consisting of rapper MF DOOM and producer/rapper Madlib. The album is a re-working created by Madlib of their 2004 debut album, Madvillainy. It was released via Stones Throw Records in 2008.

Track listing

Madvillainy 2: The Box 

On 23 July 2008 Stones Throw announced Madvillainy 2: The Box, a box set containing the Madvillainy 2 CD, the Madvillainy Demo Tape on cassette, Madlib's "One Beer (Drunk Version)" remix on a 7" single, a T-shirt with lyrics from "America's Most Blunted", and a Madvillain comic book continuing the story of the "All Caps" music video.

Madvillainy 2: The Madlib Remix

"One Beer (Drunk Version)"

Madvillainy Demo Tape

References

External links 
 

2008 remix albums
Stones Throw Records compilation albums
MF Doom albums
Madlib albums
Albums produced by Madlib